The emblem of Tuva is a light blue field with a yellow border. In the center of the field is a traditional horseman, symbolizing Tuva's sovereignty and spirit.  The coat of arms was created in 1992, and is similar to the present state emblem of Mongolia, which was adopted that same year.

Meaning of the colors
The yellow symbolizes gold and Buddhism.  Blue symbolizes the morals of nomadic herdsmen (who are commonly respected in the region), as well the Tuvan sky.  The blue pall symbolizes the confluence of the Bii-Khem (Bolshoy Yenisei) and Kaa-Khem (Maly Yenisei) rivers at the Tuvan capital of Kyzyl, where they form the Yenisei River, known to locals as the Ulug-Khem River. White symbolizes silver and virtue; additionally, it is common in Tuva for hostesses to greet guests with silver streamers in their arms.

Historical emblems

See also
 Flag of Tuva

Tuvan culture
Tuva
Tuva
Tuva
Tuva
Tuva